Army Group Don was a short-lived army group of the German Army during World War II.

On 20 November 1942 Hitler again ordered the reorganization of the southern front in the Soviet Union. The order was following: "Between the Army Group A and B at the turn of the river Don has to be sent another Army Group." Army Group Don was created as an attempt to hold the line between Army Group A and Army Group B.

Army Group Don was created from the headquarters of the Eleventh Army in the southern sector of the Eastern Front on 22 November 1942. Army Group Don only lasted until February 1943 when it was combined with Army Group B and was made into the new Army Group South.

The only commander of Army Group Don during its short history was Field Marshal (Generalfeldmarschall) Erich von Manstein. It consisted of the Sixth Army in the Stalingrad pocket, which included the encircled elements of the 4th Panzer Army, together with the Romanian Third Army.

Zhukov stated, "We now know that Manstein's plan to rescue the encircled forces at Stalingrad was to organize two shock forces - at Kotelnikovo and Tormosin." The attempt "was a total failure."

Commanders

References

Bibliography

Don
Military units and formations established in 1942
Military units and formations disestablished in 1943